Dalhana was a medieval commentator on the Sushruta Samhita, an early text on Indian medicine.
Dalhana's commentary is known as the Nibandha Samgraha.
It compiles the views of a large number of authors and commentators in the text who lived before Dalhana.

The date of Dalhana's work is determined by his quoting Cakrapani (fl. 1060) and his being quoted by Hemadri (fl. 1260), placing him between the late 11th and the early 13th century.

References

P. V. Sharma (1982), Dalhana and his Comments on Drugs, New Delhi, India Munshiram Manoharlal Publishers, .
P. V. Sharma (1999), Susruta-Samhita: With English Translation of Text and Dalhana's Commentary Along with Critical Notes, 3 Vols. Vol. I: Sutrasthana, Vol. II: Kalpasthana and Uttaratantra, Vol. III: Nidana, Sarira and Cikitsasthana; Chowkhamba Visvabharati; Varanasi.

Ayurvedacharyas
History of medieval medicine